The 2017 Big Ten women's basketball tournament was the postseason tournament held from March 1–5, 2017 at Bankers Life Fieldhouse in Indianapolis.

Seeds

All 14 Big Ten schools participated in the tournament. Teams were seeded by 2016–17 Big Ten Conference season record. The top 10 teams received a first-round bye and the top 4 teams received a double bye.

Seeding for the tournament was determined at the close of the regular conference season:

Schedule

*Game times in Eastern Time. #Rankings denote tournament seeding.

Bracket

See also

 2017 Big Ten Conference men's basketball tournament

References

Big Ten women's basketball tournament
Tournament
Big Ten women's basketball tournament
Big Ten women's basketball tournament
Big Ten
College basketball tournaments in Indiana
Women's sports in Indiana